Arthur Hadley (5 May 1876–1963) was an English footballer who played in the Football League for Leicester Fosse and Notts County.

References

1876 births
1963 deaths
Arnold F.C. players
Association football forwards
English footballers
English Football League players
Reading F.C. players
Notts County F.C. players
Leicester City F.C. players